This article includes several ranked indicators for Spain's municipalities.

By population
100 most populated municipalities in Spain as of 1 January 2019, from the revision of the padrón continuo provided by the INE.

By population density
The 100 most densely populated Spanish municipalities (2019).

By surface area
The 100 largest municipalities by area.

See also
 Demographics of Spain
 List of municipalities of Spain
 List of metropolitan areas in Spain
 Ranked lists of Spanish autonomous communities
List of mayors of the 50 largest cities in Spain

External links
 National Institute of Statistics (Spain)

References

Lists of cities by population
Spain
Municipalities of Spain
 
Municipalities, ranked

an:Municipios d'Espanya por población
es:Anexo:Municipios de España por población
eu:Espainiako hiri nagusien zerrenda
gl:Lista de concellos de España por poboación
it:Lista dei comuni spagnoli con più di 50.000 abitanti
ru:Города Испании
sv:Lista över storstäder i Spanien